Marcelo Luís Pimentel (born 3 August 1972), known simply as Pimentel, is a Brazilian former footballer who played as a right wing-back.

Club career
Born in Rio de Janeiro, Pimentel began his career with Vasco da Gama, debuting in 1991 and winning three consecutive Campeonato Carioca titles in 1992, 1993 and 1994. He transferred to Palmeiras in mid-1997, but was unable to replicate the form that had made him a mainstay at Vasco da Gama, being replaced by Francisco Arce the following season.

Personal life
Pimentel is the father of current Vasco da Gama defender Eric Pimentel.

References

1972 births
Living people
Sportspeople from Rio de Janeiro (state)
Brazilian footballers
Association football defenders
Association football forwards
CR Vasco da Gama players
Sociedade Esportiva Palmeiras players
CR Flamengo footballers
São Paulo FC players
Madureira Esporte Clube players
Tupi Football Club players
Clube Esportivo Nova Esperança players